The 2022 European Mountain Bike Championships was the 33rd edition of the European Mountain Bike Championships, an annual mountain biking competition organized by the Union Européenne de Cyclisme (UEC). Championships in 5 disciplines were held in 2022 for elite: downhill, cross-country cycling (XC), cross-country marathon (XCM), cross-country eliminator (XCE) and cross-country short circuit (XCC) .

Dates and venues
 Jablonné v Podještědí : 19 June (cross-country marathon)
 Maribor : 23–25 June (downhill)
 Anadia : 30 June–3 July (cross-country eliminator, cross-country short circuit)
 Munich : 19–20 August (cross-country)
 Dunkirk: 11 December (beach race)

Medal summary

Cross-country

Cross-country eliminator

Cross-country marathon

Cross-country short circuit

Downhill

Beachrace

Medal table

References

European Mountain Bike Championships
European Mountain Bike Championships
European Mountain Bike Championships
European Mountain Bike Championships
European Mountain Bike Championships
European Mountain Bike Championships
International cycle races hosted by Germany
International cycle races hosted by the Czech Republic
International sports competitions hosted by Slovenia
International cycle races hosted by Portugal
European Mountain Bike Championships
European Mountain Bike Championships
European Mountain Bike Championships
European Mountain Bike Championships
European Mountain Bike Championships
Sport in Maribor
Sports competitions in Munich
Sport in the Liberec Region
Sport in Anadia, Portugal
2022 European Championships